Johann Anton "John" Mais (11 June 1888, in Koblenz – 26 May 1961, in Koblenz) was a German racecar driver.

Indy 500 results

References

1888 births
1961 deaths
Indianapolis 500 drivers
Sportspeople from Koblenz
Racing drivers from Rhineland-Palatinate